Northern campaign may refer to:

Northern campaign (Irish Republican Army), attempts by the IRA to destabilise Northern Ireland between 1942 and 1944
Northern France campaign (1944), the campaign immediately after American troops broke out from the Normandy beachhead in World War II
Northern Virginia campaign, a series of battles fought in Virginia during 1862 in the American Civil War
Northern Tavriya Campaign, a 1920 military campaign of the Russian Civil War
War in the North, the northern campaign during the Spanish Civil War (1937)

See also
Northern Expedition
Northern Expeditions (disambiguation)